Joseph Odermatt, known by his religious name as Eliseo María and by his papal name as Peter III, is a Swiss Independent Catholic prelate and the current pope of the Palmarian Christian Church. Odermatt succeeded Ginés Jesús Hernández (Pope Gregory XVIII) after Hernández left the Palmarian Christian Church and returned to the Roman Catholic Church.

Biography 
Odermatt was born in Stans, Canton of Nidwalden in Switzerland. He claims to be a descendant of Saint Nicholas of Flüe. He joined the Order of Carmelites of the Holy Face in 1985 and worked for eighteen years as a missionary in South America. He served as the Order's Secretary of State from 2011 until 2016. In 2016 he succeeded Ginés Jesús Hernández as Pope of the Palmarian Christian Church, taking the papal name Peter III. He is seated at the Cathedral-Basilica of Our Crowned Mother of Palmar.

Some months later he published an encyclical letter, in which he accused his predecessor of discrediting his former Church and of stealing two million euros from the Palmarian Christian Church, alongside several goods (including a BMW X6): he subsequently declared him an apostate, excommunicated him and declared all of his acts to be null and void. Hernández denies the charges of stealing.

Odermatt disbanded the papal guard corp instituted by his predecessor, deeming it unnecessary for his security. In 2018 he travelled to the United States for the first time to participate at a "Eucharistic, Marian and Josephine Congress".

During his office, the Palmarian Christian Church established an online presence for the first time, opening a website and accounts on Facebook, Instagram, Twitter, Pinterest and a channel on YouTube.

Notes

References

Further reading

Living people
Year of birth missing (living people)
21st-century antipopes
Bishops of Independent Catholic denominations
People excommunicated by the Catholic Church
Swiss bishops
Spanish bishops
Antipopes
People from Stans
Swiss traditionalist Catholics
Spanish traditionalist Catholics
Conclavism